Ali Rezai may refer to:

Places

People
Ali Rezai (neurosurgeon), neurosurgeon